From Time to Time is a 2009 British fantasy drama film directed by Julian Fellowes starring Maggie Smith, Timothy Spall, Carice van Houten, Alex Etel, Eliza Bennett, Elisabeth Dermot-Walsh, Dominic West, Hugh Bonneville, and Pauline Collins.  It was adapted from Lucy M. Boston's children's novel The Chimneys of Green Knowe (1958).  The film was shot in Athelhampton Hall, Dorset.

Plot
Set in England, this ghostly, haunting story spans two worlds, over a century apart. Near the end of World War II, teen-aged Tolly (Alex Etel) goes to spend Christmas at his grandmother's large country estate, Green Knowe. Tolly's soldier father has been reported missing in action while his mother remains in London awaiting more information. His grandmother, Mrs. Oldknow (Maggie Smith), disapproved of her son's marriage, considering his wife a commoner. Mrs. Oldknow is financially strapped and faced with selling Green Knowe.

On Tolly's first night at Green Knowe, he sees and hears a ghostly young girl and adolescent boy. Soon after, he discovers that he magically time travels between the present and the early 19th century in the old manor house. Certain people in that time period can see and communicate with him, while he remains invisible to others. Susan, the blind daughter of Lord Thomas Oldknow, is the ghostly figure that Tolly first saw. She can speak to Tolly both in her time and his. He learns that his grandmother also sees the ancestral ghosts. Susan leads him on an adventure that unlocks family secrets laid buried for generations. Exciting events include a terrible fire, a tale of stolen jewels, and threats of a servant being sold into a press gang.

Although the lost treasure is found and Green Knowe is saved, Tolly's father is a casualty of the war. Mrs. Oldknow finally welcomes Tolly's mother into the family. Tolly is comforted when his father's ghost appears, assuring him everything will be all right.

Cast
 Alex Etel as Tolly Oldknow
 Timothy Spall as Boggis
 Maggie Smith as Mrs. Thomas Oldknow 
 Hugh Bonneville as Captain Thomas Oldknow
 Pauline Collins as Mrs. Tweedie
 Harriet Walter as Lady Gresham
 Elisabeth Dermot Walsh as Joan
 Dugald Bruce Lockhart as David
 Eliza Hope Bennett as Susan Oldknow
 Rachel Bell as Perkins
 Dominic West as John Caxton
 Carice van Houten as Maria Oldknow
 Douglas Booth as Sefton Oldknow
 Jenny McCracken as Mrs. Gross
 Christine Lohr as Mrs. Robbins
 Allen Leech as Fred Boggis
 Alan Charlesworth as Robert the Footman
 Kwayedza Kureya as Jacob
 Helen Kennedy as Nellie
 Daisy Lewis as Rose
 David Robb as Lord Farrar
 Anthony Gordon Lennox as Carbery
 Denise Stephenson as Mrs. Carbery
 Christopher Villiers as Officer
 Lynn Farleigh as Gypsy

Reception
On Rotten Tomatoes, the film has a score of 43% fresh rating based on reviews from seven critics and a rating average of 5.9 out of 10. Tom Huddleston of Time Out described the film as "an emotionally wise but logically skewed children’s tale", the logical inconsistencies of which "largely restricts the film’s appeal to bookish pre-teens". Henry Fitzherbert of the Daily Express praised the actors' performances, particularly Smith's, and noted that it "casts a magical spell by the touching conclusion".

References

External links
 
 From Time to Time at Netflix.com

2009 films
2009 fantasy films
2000s English-language films
2000s fantasy adventure films
2000s ghost films
British children's fantasy films
British ghost films
Ealing Studios films
Films about children
Films about time travel
Films based on British novels
Films based on children's books
Films directed by Julian Fellowes
Films scored by Ilan Eshkeri
Films set in the 1800s
Films set in 1944
Films set in England
Films shot in England
Films with screenplays by Julian Fellowes
2000s British films